The Flag Officer Scotland and Northern Ireland (FOSNI) was a senior post in the Royal Navy of the United Kingdom. It was based at HM Naval Base Clyde, and the holder of the post was the Royal Navy’s senior officer in Scotland. The post of FOSNI, dating from 1946, was re-scoped and re-named in 1994 to Flag Officer Scotland, Northern England & Northern Ireland (FOSNNI), then named back in 2015, before being dis-established in 2020.

History
The Flag Officer Scotland and Northern Ireland was the most senior naval position in Scotland and is the successor to appointments starting with the Senior Officer on the Coast of Scotland, established in 1913, just prior to the outbreak of the First World War. The title was altered to Commander-in-Chief, Rosyth in 1916. From 1946 the post became the Flag Officer Scotland & Northern Ireland. Between 1961 and 1994 the Flag Officer Scotland and Northern Ireland was triple-hatted as Commander Northern Sub-Area (NORLANT) of Allied Command Atlantic (ACLANT), and as Commander Nore Sub-Area Channel (NORECHAN) of Allied Command Channel. Based at RAF Pitreavie Castle, NORECHAN was tasked to prevent Soviet Navy ships and submarines from entering the North Sea. When the command moved from Rosyth to HMNB Clyde in 1994, it took responsibility for a larger area, becoming the Flag Officer Scotland, Northern England and Northern Ireland. In 2015 the post reverted to Flag Officer Scotland and Northern Ireland. The post was removed under the Royal Navy's Navy Command Transformation Programme and renamed Commodore Submarine Service (COSM).

Major subordinate stone frigates under C-in-C Rosyth on the outbreak of the Second World War included HMS Flora at Invergordon; HMS Bacchante (a shore establishment) at Aberdeen, HMS Claverhouse at Leith, and HMS Calliope on the Tyne. Bacchante had been commanded by the Senior Naval Officer, Aberdeen from 1915 to 1919  and then the Flag Officer-in-Charge, Aberdeen from 1942 to 1945. Wartime subsidiary bases included Aultbea on Loch Ewe. Facilities at Aultbea were established in February 1915 during World War I and partially deactivated in April 1919. Aultbea was reactivated during World War II in 1940 following the German attack on Scapa Flow and subsequent sinking of HMS Royal Oak, when the Home Fleet was temporarily based there. It was also a staging point for arctic convoys that operated out of Loch Ewe. It remained in operation until October 1967.

Admirals Commanding
Flag Officers have been:

Admiral Commanding on the Coast of Scotland; 1913–1916
Included:

Commander-in-Chief, Rosyth; 1913–1919

Commander-in-Chief, Coast of Scotland; 1919–1939

Commander-in-Chief, Rosyth; 1939–1946

Flag Officer Scotland and Northern Ireland; 1946–1994

Flag Officer Scotland, Northern England, Northern Ireland; 1994–2015
Note: From 2005, the post holder also held the title of Flag Officer, Reserves and Flag Officer Regional Forces.

Flag Officer Scotland and Northern Ireland; 2015–2020

References

 

S
Military units and formations disestablished in 2020